

Helge Arthur Auleb (24 March 1887 – 14 March 1964) was a general in the Wehrmacht of Nazi Germany during World War II. He was born in Gehren.

Auleb commanded the 6th Infantry Division as part of VI Army Corps during Operation Typhoon in October 1941. He received the German Cross in Gold on 26 December 1941.

Awards
 German Cross in Gold on 26 December 1941 as Generalleutnant in the 6th Infantry Division
 1914 Iron Cross 2nd Class & 1st Class
 1939 Clasp to the Iron Cross 2nd Class & 1st Class

References

Citations

Bibliography

 

1887 births
1964 deaths
People from Ilm-Kreis
People from Schwarzburg-Sondershausen
German Army officers of World War II
Generals of Infantry (Wehrmacht)
German Army personnel of World War I
Recipients of the Gold German Cross
Recipients of the clasp to the Iron Cross, 1st class
20th-century Freikorps personnel
Military personnel from Thuringia